The 34th General Assembly of Prince Edward Island was in session from March 19, 1901, to November 9, 1904. The Liberal Party led by Donald Farquharson formed the government. In December 1901, Arthur Peters became Liberal party leader and Premier.

There were four sessions of the 34th General Assembly:

Samuel E. Reid was elected speaker.

Members

Kings

Prince

Queens

Notes:

External links
  Election results for the Prince Edward Island Legislative Assembly, 1900-12-12
 Prince Edward Island, garden province of Canada, WH Crosskill (1904)
 Canadian Parliamentary Guide, 1912, EJ Chambers

Terms of the General Assembly of Prince Edward Island
1901 establishments in Prince Edward Island
1904 disestablishments in Prince Edward Island